Barar Village is located in Ajnala tehsil of Amritsar district in Punjab. It is 20 Km away from sub-district headquarter Ajnala. The population is 2,318, 1,125 male and 1,103 female. Pincode of Barar village is 143108.

References 

Villages in Amritsar district